The Women's team pursuit competition at the 2022 UCI Track Cycling World Championships was held on 12 and 13 October 2022.

Results

Qualifying
The qualifying was started on 12 October at 13:30. The eight fastest teams advanced to the first round, the first four to the gold medal semi-finals, teams five to eight to minor semi-finals.

First round
The first round was started at 18:30.

First round heats were held as follows:
Heat 1: 6th v 7th fastest
Heat 2: 5th v 8th fastest
Heat 3: 2nd v 3rd fastest
Heat 4: 1st v 4th fastest

The winners of heats three and four advanced to the gold medal race. The remaining six teams were ranked on time, from which the top two proceeded to the bronze medal race.

 QG = qualified for gold medal final
 QB = qualified for bronze medal final

Finals
The finals were started on 13 October at 21:12.

References

Women's team pursuit